The Office of Special Counsel was an office of the United States Department of Justice established by provisions in the Ethics in Government Act that expired in 1999. The provisions were replaced by Department of Justice regulation 28 CFR Part 600, which created the successor office of special counsel. The current regulations were drafted by former acting Solicitor General Neal Katyal.

The Independent Counsel was an independent prosecutor—distinct from the Attorney General of the United States Department of Justice—who provided reports to the United States Congress under .

History
In 1978, a Democratic Party-majority Congress was determined to curb the powers of the president and other senior executive branch officials due in part to the Watergate scandal and related events such as the Saturday Night Massacre. They drafted and passed the Ethics in Government Act of 1978, creating a special prosecutor (later changed to Independent Counsel) position, which could be used by Congress or the Attorney General to investigate individuals holding or formerly holding certain high positions in the federal government and in national presidential election campaign organizations.

The prosecutor, who was appointed by a special panel of the United States Court of Appeals for the District of Columbia Circuit, could investigate allegations of any misconduct, with an unlimited budget and no deadline, and could be dismissed only by the Attorney General for "good cause" or by the special panel of the court when the independent counsel's task was completed. As the president could not dismiss those investigating the executive branch it was felt that the independence of the office would ensure impartiality of any reports presented to Congress. However, there have been critics of this law including Supreme Court Justice Antonin Scalia. Many argued the new Independent Counsel's office was a sort of "fourth branch" of government that had virtually unlimited powers and was answerable to no one. However, the constitutionality of the new office was ultimately upheld in the 1988 Supreme Court case Morrison v. Olson.

Previously under the Independent Counsel Reauthorization Act of 1994, United States Attorney General Janet Reno had Donald Smaltz appointed Independent Counsel by the United States Court of Appeals for the District of Columbia (Division for the Purpose of Appointing Independent Counsels Ethics in Government Act of 1978, As Amended, Division 94-2) on September 9, 1994, to "investigate to the maximum extent authorized by law" whether the US Department of Agriculture Secretary Mike Espy "committed a violation of any federal criminal law . . . relating in any way to the acceptance of gifts by him from organizations or individuals with business pending before the Department of Agriculture." Smaltz was also given jurisdiction to investigate "other allegations or evidence of violations of any federal criminal law by organizations or individuals developed during the course of the investigation of Secretary Espy and connected with or arising out of that investigation."

The most famous Independent Counsel was Kenneth Starr, whose report led to the impeachment of President Bill Clinton by the United States House of Representatives, though he was later acquitted by the United States Senate.

Three Independent Counsel investigations had jurisdictions that were specified in regulations: the Iran-Contra investigation in 1987 (28 Code of Federal Regulations sec. 601.1); Edwin Meese III, the Wedtech case in 1987 (sec. 602.1), and President Bill and First Lady Hillary Clinton in the Madison Guaranty/Whitewater case in 1994 (sec. 603.1).

After the expiration of the Ethics in Government Act in 1999, the Office of Independent Counsel was replaced with the office of Special Counsel, defined by regulation 28 CFR 600, which in turn is based on Congressional statute 28 USC 510.

Patrick Fitzgerald was appointed Special Counsel in 2003 regarding the investigation into the public naming of CIA spy Valerie Plame. His appointment was based on 28 USC 510.

Under 28 CFR 600, Robert Mueller was appointed Special Counsel in 2017 to investigate possible interference by the Russian government in the 2016 presidential election, including a possible criminal conspiracy between Russia and the presidential campaign of Donald Trump. The investigation was officially concluded on March 22, 2019. The report concluded that the Russian Internet Research Agency's social media campaign supported Trump's presidential candidacy while attacking Clinton's, and Russian intelligence hacked and released damaging material from the Clinton campaign and various Democratic Party organizations. The investigation "identified numerous links between the Russian government and the Trump campaign", and determined that the Trump campaign "expected it would benefit electorally" from Russian hacking efforts. However, ultimately "the investigation did not establish that members of the Trump campaign conspired or coordinated with the Russian government in its election interference activities". Mueller later said that the investigation's conclusion on Russian interference "deserves the attention of every American".

In 2019 Attorney General William Barr appointed a federal prosecutor, John Durham, to counter-investigate the origins of the FBI's Crossfire Hurricane probe. On December 1, 2020, the Associated Press reported that Barr had appointed Durham as a Special Counsel under the federal statute governing such appointments to conduct an investigation into "…the investigation of Special Counsel Robert S. Mueller III," by which was meant the FBI personnel who worked on Crossfire Hurricane before joining the Mueller team.

Timeline
 Originally created by the Ethics in Government Act of 1978 and the Ethics in Government Act Amendments of 1982 (96 Stat. 2039), January 3, 1983
 Reauthorized for five years by the Independent Counsel Reauthorization Act of 1987 (101 Stat. 1293), December 15, 1987
 Lapsed, December 15, 1992, by failure of reauthorization
 Reinstituted by the Independent Counsel Reauthorization Act of 1994 (PL 103-270), June 30, 1994
 Converted into the Office of the Special Counsel end of 1999.

Investigations carried out by Independent Counsel
 Independent Counsel Arthur Christy relating to allegations of illegal drug use of Jimmy Carter's aide Hamilton Jordan, 1978
 Independent Counsel Leon Silverman relating to Raymond Donovan, 1981–1984
 Independent Counsel Jacob A. Stein relating to Edwin Meese III, 1984
 Independent Counsel Whitney North Seymour, Jr. relating to Michael Deaver, 1981–1989
 Independent Counsel Alexia Morrison relating to Theodore Olson, 1986–1988
 Independent Counsels Arlin Adams and Larry Thompson relating to Samuel Pierce and others associated with the U.S. Department of Housing and Urban Development, 1988–1998
 Independent Counsel Lawrence E. Walsh relating to the Iran-Contra affair, 1986–1993
 Independent Counsels Joseph diGenova and Michael Zeldin relating to improper search of passport records, 1992–1995
 Independent Counsel Donald Smaltz relating to charges of corruption against Mike Espy, 1994–2001. Espy acquitted at trial. 
 Independent Counsel Daniel Pearson relating to the allegations of the Commerce Department trade mission controversy, 1995–96
 Independent Counsel David Barrett relating to Henry Cisneros payments controversy, 1995–2006
 Independent Counsel Curtis Emery von Kann relating to Eli J. Segal, 1996–1998
 Independent Counsel Carol Elder Bruce relating to Bruce Babbitt and allegations of public corruption surrounding the Department of Interior's denial of a casino contract to an Indian Nation and the truth or falsity of testimony to a Senate Committee concerning the official conduct, 1998-2000
 Independent Counsel Ralph Lancaster relating to charges of influence-peddling and the solicitation of illegal campaign contributions against Labor Secretary Alexis Herman, 1998–2000
 Independent Counsels Kenneth Starr and Robert Ray relating to the suicide of Vince Foster, the Whitewater scandal, Travelgate, Filegate, and later the Clinton–Lewinsky scandal, 1994-2001 
 Special Counsel, Nicholas J. Bua (November 13, 1991) relating to allegations that high-ranking officials of the United States Department of Justice during the Reagan Administration (1981–1989) had acted improperly for personal gain to bankrupt Inslaw Inc.  Bua was appointed by Attorney General William Barr to advise Barr on whether or not an independent prosecutor ought to be appointed to investigate the allegations.
 Special Counsel Robert Mueller to investigate possible interference by the Russian government in the 2016 presidential election, which include a possible criminal conspiracy between the Russian government and the presidential campaign of Donald Trump.
 Special Counsel John Durham, to counter-investigate the origins of the FBI's Crossfire Hurricane probe.
 Special Counsel Jack Smith to investigate Donald Trump's attempts to delay the certification of the 2020 United States presidential election and his mishandling of files recovered during the FBI search of Mar-a-Lago.
 Special Counsel Robert K. Hur to investigate the Joe Biden classified documents incident

See also
Mueller special counsel investigation

References

External links
 United States Office of the Independent Counsel Official
 Final Report of Independent Counsel Walsh (August 4, 1993)
 Final Report of the Independent Counsel (March 2002)
 Final Report of Independent Counsel Starr
 IC Starr's Referral Report to Congress (September 9, 1998)
 Report of Independent Counsel Smaltz (October 2001)
 NARA Archives of the Independent Counsels
 Report on the Death of Vincent W. Foster, Jr,/by the Office of Independent Counsel in Re Madison Guaranty Savings and Loan Association HATI Trust Digital Library, Universities of Michigan and Purdue, the complete 137 page, 2 vol. report with app., footnotes, and exhibits.

Independent Counsel
Independent Counsel
Prosecution
Government agencies established in 1983
Government agencies disestablished in 1999
United States Department of Justice